The 2009 OFC Futsal Championship was the sixth edition of the main international futsal tournament of the Oceanian region. It took place from July 7 to July 11, 2009, and was hosted by Fiji, which had also hosted the previous edition. The number of participating teams dropped from seven to just four, as French Polynesia, New Zealand and Tuvalu failed to return from the previous year's competition. Previously, the Championship had been held every four years; the 2009 edition marked the beginning of an annual tournament.

The defending champions, the Solomon Islands, retained their title, defeating the hosts by eight goals to one in the final.

The tournament's Golden Ball (Player of the tournament) award went to Jack Wetney of the Solomon Islands.

The championship was also notable as it witnessed a new world record for the fastest ever goal scored in an official futsal match. The scorer was Solomon Islands team captain Elliot Ragomo, who scored against New Caledonia three seconds into the game.

Championship 
The four teams played one another over the first three days, with the top two advancing to the final, and the other two facing each other for third place.

Group stage

Third place match

Final

References

OFC Futsal Championship
Oceania
Futsal
2009